Twin Beach is an unincorporated community in Posey Township, Clay County, Indiana. It is part of the Terre Haute Metropolitan Statistical Area.

History
Twin Beach took its name from a former public beach on the lake.

Geography

References

Unincorporated communities in Clay County, Indiana
Unincorporated communities in Indiana
Terre Haute metropolitan area